Verriest is a surname. Notable people with the surname include:

Georges Verriest (1909–1985), French footballer
Jules Verriest (born 1946), Belgian footballer and manager